Penelope Maddy (born 4 July 1950) is an American philosopher. Maddy is Emerita UCI Distinguished Professor of Logic and Philosophy of Science and of Mathematics at the University of California, Irvine. She is well known for her influential work in the philosophy of mathematics, where she has worked on mathematical realism (especially set-theoretic realism) and mathematical naturalism.

Education and career
Maddy received her Ph.D. from Princeton University in 1979. Her dissertation, Set Theoretical Realism, was supervised by John P. Burgess.  She taught at the University of Notre Dame and University of Illinois, Chicago before joining Irvine in 1987.

She was elected a Fellow of the American Academy of Arts and Sciences in 1998.
The German Mathematical Society awarded her a Gauss Lectureship in 2006.

Philosophical work

Maddy's early work, culminating in Realism in Mathematics, defended Kurt Gödel's position that mathematics is a true description of a mind-independent realm that we can access through our intuition.  However, she suggested that some mathematical entities are in fact concrete, unlike, notably, Gödel, who assumed all mathematical objects are abstract.  She suggested that sets can be causally efficacious, and in fact share all the causal and spatiotemporal properties of their elements.  Thus, when one sees three cups on a table, one also sees the set.  She used contemporary work in cognitive science and psychology to support this position, pointing out that just as at a certain age we begin to see objects rather than mere sense perceptions, there is also a certain age at which we begin to see sets rather than just objects.

In the 1990s, she moved away from this position, towards a position described in Naturalism in Mathematics.  Her "naturalist" position, like Quine's, suggests that since science is our most successful project so far for knowing about the world, philosophers should adopt the methods of science in their own discipline, and especially when discussing science.  As Maddy stated in an interview, "If you're a 'naturalist', you think that science shouldn't be held to extra-scientific standards, that it doesn't require extra-scientific ratification."  However, rather than a unified picture of the sciences like Quine's, her picture has mathematics as separate.  That is, mathematics is neither supported nor undermined by the needs and goals of science but is allowed to obey its own criteria.  This means that traditional metaphysical and epistemological concerns of the philosophy of mathematics are misplaced.  Like Wittgenstein, she suggests that many of these puzzles arise merely because of the application of language outside its proper domain of significance.

She has been dedicated to understanding and explaining the methods that set theorists use in agreeing on axioms, especially those that go beyond ZFC.

Selected publications 
  (a copy with corrections is available at the author's web page)
 
 Realism in Mathematics, Oxford University Press, 1990. 
 Naturalism in Mathematics, Oxford University Press, 1997. 
 Second Philosophy, Oxford University Press, 2007. 
 Defending the Axioms, Oxford University Press, 2011. 
 What do Philosophers Do? Skepticism and the Practice of Philosophy, Oxford University Press, 2017.

See also
 Cabal (set theory)

References

External links 
 Penelope Maddy's faculty page
 Penelope Maddy: a philosopher you can count on – Portrait in Scientific American by Laura Vanderkam, 13 January 2009
 Interview at 3AM Magazine

1950 births
Living people
20th-century American philosophers
21st-century American philosophers
Philosophers of science
Philosophers of mathematics
American logicians
Princeton University alumni
University of California, Irvine faculty
American women philosophers
Women mathematicians
Fellows of the American Academy of Arts and Sciences
Lakatos Award winners
20th-century American women
21st-century American women